Brazoria truncata, common name rattlesnake flower, is a plant species in the family Lamiaceae, first described in 1834. It is endemic to Texas, found in the south-central and eastern parts of the state.

Two varieties are recognized:
Brazoria truncata var. pulcherrima (Lundell) M.W.Turner – Centerville brazos-mint
Brazoria truncata var. truncata

References

Lamiaceae
Endemic flora of Texas
Plants described in 1834
Flora without expected TNC conservation status